Unio delphinus is a species of bivalve belonging to the family Unionidae.

Distribution
This species occurs in the Atlantic basins of the Iberian Peninsula and Morocco

References

 Welter-Schultes, F.W. (2012). European non-marine molluscs, a guide for species identification. Planet Poster Editions, Göttingen. A1-A3, 1–679, Q1-Q78

External links
 Spengler L. (1793). Beskrivelse over et nyt Slægt af de toskallede Konchylier, forhen af mig kaldet Chæna, saa og over det Linnéiske Slægt Mya, hvilket nøiere bestemmes, og inddeles i tvende Slægter. Skrivter af Naturhistorie-Selskabet. 3(1): 16-69, pl. 2
 Graf, D.; Cummings, K. (2019). Musselp database: The Freshwater Mussels (Unionoida) of the World (and other less consequential bivalves)

<div align=center>
Right and left valve of the same specimen:

</div align=center>

Unionidae

Fauna of the Pyrenees